is an arcade game released by Data East in 1990.

The mobile phone game company G-mode acquired the rights to the game after Data East's bankruptcy, and a mobile phone version of the game has been released for the Vodafone EZweb network.

Though the game was initially planned as a sugoroku game titled , the content was completely changed during production into its released form, according to the arcade game magazine Arcadia (Coin Op'ed Video Game Magazine Arcadia). The sheep from this game later appeared in Suiko Enbu: Fuunsaiki as Makoto Mizoguchi's desperation move.

Gameplay
Trio The Punch is a beat 'em up game where the player chooses a character from three playable characters, and fights numerous enemies across a side-scrolling game screen. Most of the levels are played scrolling to the right, but some loop around the left and right edges of the screen. Other levels allow the player to scroll upwards or downwards by jumping, while some do not contain scrolling at all. The game is completed when the player finishes all 35 levels.

The player controls their character with an 8-way joystick and 3 buttons (attack, jump, and special attack). Certain enemies leave behind a heart on the screen after being defeated, and collecting the required number of these hearts for each level causes a boss to appear, who must be defeated in order to complete the level. However, bosses appear from the start in some levels, so hearts do not always need to be collected.

Setting
The game begins in a tropical environment, but later levels may take place in the rainforest, urban cities, Middle Eastern desert, medieval Japan, or a futuristic military base. No instructions or explanations on the plot structure are given as the player progresses across the different levels.

The game also contains a  "game over" screen, which consists of an image of Michelangelo's sculpture, the Dying Slave. Choosing to continue the game on this screen causes the sculpture's face to change into a childish, cartoonish version of the original image, though the shadowed portion of the face remains in its original, realistic depiction.

Text
The game's text is displayed almost entirely in Japanese, and uses a unique mixture of hiragana, katakana, and kanji, which ignores conventional grammar and speech.

As with many other Japanese games, English appears frequently, but is treated with disregard for grammar and readability.

In-game persona
Many of the game's enemies appear in contexts. While it is fitting to have ninjas appear in the medieval Japan level, and to have robots appear in the space level, the boss of the first level is a gigantic bronze statue of Karnov, which is carried on the shoulders of 4 smaller Karnovs. The word  is etched onto the statue's base, and the statue attacks by breathing fire, and will change expressions after receiving damage. The boss of the second level is a gigantic bronze statue of a human fist.

Parodic elements
Trio the Punch is similar to games like Parodius and Konami Wai Wai World in the sense that Data East parodied some of its own games by having Karnov and Chelnov appear as enemies. Other parodic elements include the Darumasan ga koronda feature, where all of the objects on the screen are forced to stop moving.

Structure and game design
The traditional game structure of defeating weak, generic enemies before facing a stronger boss is often ignored in Trio the Punch. Some levels are much shorter than others, and only require one or two enemies to be killed before the boss, and the boss may even appear at the very beginning of some levels.

Though the game is seemingly an orthodox side-scrolling action game, jumping on top of enemy bullets causes the player's character to bounce away as if he had landed on a trampoline. This action occurs often throughout the game, but the image of bouncing off of small bullets gives the game an unnatural feel where the laws of physics are ignored.

The game's BGM was composed by Data East's music team, .

Characters
 Tough Guy - The first playable character wears a baseball cap and track gear, and uses a sandbag and iron claw as weapons. He is best at close-range combat, and is the only playable character that can attack upwards. He makes cameo appearances in several other Data East games, including Boogie Wings (The Great Ragtime Show in Japan).
 Ninja - The second playable character is a ninja that wears a samurai mask over his face. He attacks with throwing knives and shuriken, and is the only character who can use long-range attacks from the start. He automatically transforms into a tree every time he receives damage from enemy characters, and the player cannot move or attack while the transformation lasts.
 Swordsman - The third playable character is a muscular swordsman who can wield a torch, sword, or morning star to fend off enemies. He has the longest weapon reach out of the three characters.
  - Chin is a stereotype of the martial arts masters that appear in old kung-fu movies, and seems to be a teacher figure for the three playable characters. However, he appears as a boss in levels 7 and 24, where his body stretches or grows gigantic, and he attacks by shooting bullets shaped like the character 痛 (lit. "pain" or "hurt").
  - The title character from Karnov appears as a generic enemy in Trio the Punch. He is bald, bearded, obese, and half-naked, and appears in several different color and shape variations.
  - The title character from Chelnov appears as a boss character in Trio the Punch. His body is encased in a powersuit, and he attacks with a huge hammer, which was not present in Chelnov.

Reception 
In Japan, Game Machine listed Trio The Punch – Never Forget Me... on their May 15, 1990 issue as being the twenty-fourth most-successful table arcade unit of the month.

References

External links
 Official G-Mode webpage of Trio the Punch - Never Forget Me... (Japanese)
 
 arcade-history

1990 video games
Arcade video games
Beat 'em ups
Data East video games
PlayStation 2 games
Mobile games
Video games about ninja
Video games developed in Japan
Data East arcade games